Rapides Opera House is located in Alexandria, Louisiana. It is a Romanesque building designed by Favrot & Livaudais and built in 1903. It was added to the National Register of Historic Places on June 11, 1981. It was delisted on December 28, 2015.

See also
List of opera houses
Theatre in Louisiana

References

Theatres completed in 1903
Buildings and structures in Alexandria, Louisiana
Romanesque Revival architecture in Louisiana
Opera houses in Louisiana
Theatres in Louisiana
Former National Register of Historic Places in Louisiana
National Register of Historic Places in Rapides Parish, Louisiana
Opera houses on the National Register of Historic Places
Event venues on the National Register of Historic Places in Louisiana